A statue of John Huston was installed in Isla Cuale, Zona Romántica, Puerto Vallarta, in the Mexican state of Jalisco, in 1988. The sculpture commemorated Huston's film Night of the Iguana (1964) and "its part in local history".

See also

 1988 in art

References

External links
 

1988 establishments in Mexico
1988 sculptures
Monuments and memorials in Jalisco
Outdoor sculptures in Puerto Vallarta
Sculptures of men in Mexico
Statues in Jalisco
Zona Romántica